The Miriti River is a river of Rondônia state in western Brazil. It is a tributary of the Preto River.

Part of the river's watershed is covered by the  Jacundá National Forest, a sustainable use conservation unit.

See also
List of rivers of Rondônia

References

Brazilian Ministry of Transport

Rivers of Rondônia